The 48th United States Congress was a meeting of the legislative branch of the United States federal government, consisting of the United States Senate and the United States House of Representatives. It met in Washington, D.C. from March 4, 1883, to March 4, 1885, during the last two years of Chester A. Arthur's presidency. The apportionment of seats in the House of Representatives was based on the 1880 United States census. The Senate had a Republican majority, and the House had a Democratic majority.

Major events

 September 5, 1883: Mary F. Hoyt became the first woman appointed to the U.S. federal civil service (and the second person appointed by examination (in which she came top) instituted under the Pendleton Civil Service Reform Act) when she became a clerk in the Bank Redemption Agency of the Department of the Treasury.
 October 15, 1883: The Supreme Court of the United States declared part of the Civil Rights Act of 1875 unconstitutional, as the Court allowed private individuals and corporations to discriminate based on race.
 November 18, 1883: U.S. and Canadian railroads instituted 5 standard continental time zones, ending the confusion of thousands of local times.
 August 10, 1884: An earthquake measuring 5.5  (based on the felt area) affected a very large portion of the eastern United States. The shock had a maximum Mercalli intensity of VII (Very strong). Chimneys were toppled in New York, New Jersey, Connecticut, and Pennsylvania. Property damage was severe in Jamaica and Amityville in New York.
 October 6, 1884: The United States Naval War College was established in Newport, Rhode Island.
 October 22, 1884: International Meridian Conference in Washington, D.C. fixed the Greenwich meridian as the world's prime meridian.
 November 4, 1884: 1884 United States presidential election: Democratic Governor of New York Grover Cleveland defeated Republican James G. Blaine in a very close contest to win the first of his non-consecutive terms.
 December 6: 1884: The Washington Monument was completed.

Major legislation

Territories organized 
May 17, 1884: District of Alaska was organized.

Party summary
The count below identifies party affiliations at the beginning of the first session of this Congress, and includes members from vacancies and newly admitted states, when they were first seated. Changes resulting from subsequent replacements are shown below in the "Changes in membership" section.

Senate

House of Representatives

Leadership

Senate 
 President: Vacant.  Chester Arthur (R), the most recent Senate president, had become U.S. president on the death of his predecessor September 19, 1881, leaving the office vacant through the end of this Congress.
 President pro tempore: George F. Edmunds (R)
 Republican Conference Chairman: John Sherman
 Democratic Caucus Chairman: George H. Pendleton

House of Representatives 
Speaker: John G. Carlisle (D)
 Democratic Caucus Chairman: George W. Geddes
 Republican Conference Chairman: Joseph Gurney Cannon
 Democratic Campaign Committee Chairman: William Rosecrans

Members
This list is arranged by chamber, then by state.
Skip to House of Representatives, below

Senate
Senators are listed by their states and Senate class numbers, which indicate the cycle of their election.

Alabama 
 2. John T. Morgan (D)
 3. James L. Pugh (D)

Arkansas 
 2. Augustus H. Garland (D)
 3. James D. Walker (D)

California 
 1. John F. Miller (R)
 3. James T. Farley (D)

Colorado 
 2. Thomas M. Bowen (R)
 3. Nathaniel P. Hill (R)

Connecticut 
 1. Joseph R. Hawley (R)
 3. Orville H. Platt (R)

Delaware 
 1. Thomas F. Bayard Sr. (D)
 2. Eli M. Saulsbury (D)

Florida 
 1. Charles W. Jones (D)
 3. Wilkinson Call (D)

Georgia 
 2. Alfred H. Colquitt (D)
 3. Joseph E. Brown (D)

Illinois 
 2. Shelby M. Cullom (R)
 3. John A. Logan (R)

Indiana 
 1. Benjamin Harrison (R)
 3. Daniel W. Voorhees (D)

Iowa 
 2. James F. Wilson (R)
 3. William B. Allison (R)

Kansas 
 2. Preston B. Plumb (R)
 3. John J. Ingalls (R)

Kentucky 
 2. James B. Beck (D)
 3. John S. Williams (D)

Louisiana 
 2. Randall L. Gibson (D)
 3. Benjamin F. Jonas (D)

Maine 
 1. Eugene Hale (R)
 2. William P. Frye (R)

Maryland 
 1. Arthur Pue Gorman (D)
 3. James B. Groome (D)

Massachusetts 
 1. Henry L. Dawes (R)
 2. George F. Hoar (R)

Michigan 
 1. Omar D. Conger (R)
 2. Thomas W. Palmer (R)

Minnesota 
 1. Samuel J. R. McMillan (R)
 2. Dwight M. Sabin (R)

Mississippi 
 1. James Z. George (D)
 2. Lucius Q. C. Lamar (D)

Missouri 
 1. Francis M. Cockrell (D)
 3. George G. Vest (D)

Nebraska 
 1. Charles H. Van Wyck (R)
 2. Charles F. Manderson (R)

Nevada 
 1. James G. Fair (D)
 3. John P. Jones (R)

New Hampshire 
 2. Austin F. Pike (R), from August 2, 1883
 3. Henry W. Blair (R)

New Jersey 
 1. William J. Sewell (R)
 2. John R. McPherson (D)

New York 
 1. Warner Miller (R)
 3. Elbridge G. Lapham (R)

North Carolina 
 2. Matt W. Ransom (D)
 3. Zebulon B. Vance (D)

Ohio 
 1. John Sherman (R)
 3. George H. Pendleton (D)

Oregon 
 2. Joseph N. Dolph (R)
 3. James H. Slater (D)

Pennsylvania 
 1. John I. Mitchell (R)
 3. J. Donald Cameron (R)

Rhode Island 
 1. Nelson W. Aldrich (R)
 2. Henry B. Anthony (R), until September 2, 1884
 William P. Sheffield (R), November 19, 1884 – January 20, 1885
 Jonathan Chace (R), from January 20, 1885

South Carolina 
 2. Matthew C. Butler (D)
 3. Wade Hampton III (D)

Tennessee 
 1. Howell E. Jackson (D)
 2. Isham G. Harris (D)

Texas 
 1. Samuel B. Maxey (D)
 2. Richard Coke (D)

Vermont 
 1. George F. Edmunds (R)
 3. Justin S. Morrill (R)

Virginia 
 1. William Mahone (RA)
 2. Harrison H. Riddleberger (RA)

West Virginia 
 1. Johnson N. Camden (D)
 2. John E. Kenna (D)

Wisconsin 
 1. Philetus Sawyer (R)
 3. Angus Cameron (R)

House of Representatives
Members of the House of Representatives are preceded by their district numbers.

Alabama 
 . Thomas H. Herndon (D), until March 28, 1883
 James T. Jones (D), from December 3, 1883
 . Hilary A. Herbert (D)
 . William C. Oates (D)
 . Charles M. Shelley (D), until January 9, 1885
 George H. Craig (R), from January 9, 1885
 . Thomas Williams (D)
 . Goldsmith W. Hewitt (D)
 . William H. Forney (D)
 . Luke Pryor (D)

Arkansas 
 . Poindexter Dunn (D)
 . James K. Jones (D), until February 19, 1885
 . John H. Rogers (D)
 . Samuel W. Peel (D)
 . Clifton R. Breckinridge (D)

California 
 . William S. Rosecrans (D)
 . James H. Budd (D)
 . Barclay Henley (D)
 . Pleasant B. Tully (D)
 . John R. Glascock (D)
 . Charles A. Sumner (D)

Colorado 
 . James B. Belford (R)

Connecticut 
 . William W. Eaton (D)
 . Charles L. Mitchell (D)
 . John T. Wait (R)
 . Edward W. Seymour (D)

Delaware 
 . Charles B. Lore (D)

Florida 
 . Robert H. M. Davidson (D)
 . Horatio Bisbee Jr. (R)

Georgia 
 . John C. Nicholls (D)
 . Henry G. Turner (D)
 . Charles F. Crisp (D)
 . Hugh Buchanan (D)
 . Nathaniel J. Hammond (D)
 . James H. Blount (D)
 . Judson C. Clements (D)
 . Seaborn Reese (D)
 . Allen D. Candler (D)
 . Thomas Hardeman Jr. (D)

Illinois 
 . Ransom W. Dunham (R)
 . John F. Finerty (ID)
 . George R. Davis (R)
 . George E. Adams (R)
 . Reuben Ellwood (R)
 . Robert R. Hitt (R)
 . Thomas J. Henderson (R)
 . William Cullen (R)
 . Lewis E. Payson (R)
 . Nicholas E. Worthington (D)
 . William H. Neece (D)
 . James M. Riggs (D)
 . William M. Springer (D)
 . Jonathan H. Rowell (R)
 . Joseph G. Cannon (R)
 . Aaron Shaw (D)
 . Samuel W. Moulton (D)
 . William R. Morrison (D)
 . Richard W. Townshend (D)
 . John R. Thomas (R)

Indiana 
 . John J. Kleiner (D)
 . Thomas R. Cobb (D)
 . Strother M. Stockslager (D)
 . William S. Holman (D)
 . Courtland C. Matson (D)
 . Thomas M. Browne (R)
 . Stanton J. Peelle (R), until May 22, 1884
 William E. English (D), from May 22, 1884
 . John E. Lamb (D)
 . Thomas B. Ward (D)
 . Thomas J. Wood (D)
 . George W. Steele (R)
 . Robert Lowry (D)
 . William H. Calkins (R), until October 20, 1884
 Benjamin F. Shively (AM), from December 1, 1884

Iowa 
 . Moses A. McCoid (R)
 . Jeremiah H. Murphy (D)
 . David B. Henderson (R)
 . Luman H. Weller (GB)
 . James Wilson (R), until March 3, 1885
 Benjamin T. Frederick (D), from March 3, 1885
 . Marsena E. Cutts (R), until September 1, 1883
 John C. Cook (D), from October 9, 1883
 . John A. Kasson (R), until July 13, 1884
 Hiram Y. Smith (R), from December 2, 1884
 . William P. Hepburn (R)
 . William H. M. Pusey (D)
 . Adoniram J. Holmes (R)
 . Isaac S. Struble (R)

Kansas 
 . John A. Anderson (R)
 . Dudley C. Haskell (R), until December 16, 1883
 Edward H. Funston (R), from March 21, 1884
 . Thomas Ryan (R)
 . Lewis Hanback (R)
 . Edmund N. Morrill (R)
 . Bishop W. Perkins (R)
 . Samuel R. Peters (R)

Kentucky 
 . Oscar Turner (ID)
 . James F. Clay (D)
 . John E. Halsell (D)
 . Thomas A. Robertson (D)
 . Albert S. Willis (D)
 . John G. Carlisle (D)
 . Joseph C. S. Blackburn (D)
 . Philip B. Thompson Jr. (D)
 . William W. Culbertson (R)
 . John D. White (R)
 . Frank L. Wolford (D)

Louisiana 
 . Carleton Hunt (D)
 . E. John Ellis (D)
 . William Pitt Kellogg (R)
 . Newton C. Blanchard (D)
 . J. Floyd King (D)
 . Edward T. Lewis (D)

Maine 
 . Charles A. Boutelle (R)
 . Nelson Dingley Jr. (R)
 . Seth L. Milliken (R)
 . Thomas B. Reed (R)

Maryland 
 . George W. Covington (D)
 . J. Frederick C. Talbott (D)
 . Fetter S. Hoblitzell (D)
 . John V. L. Findlay (D)
 . Hart B. Holton (R)
 . Louis E. McComas (R)

Massachusetts 
 . Robert T. Davis (R)
 . John D. Long (R)
 . Ambrose A. Ranney (R)
 . Patrick A. Collins (D)
 . Leopold Morse (D)
 . Henry B. Lovering (D)
 . Eben F. Stone (R)
 . William A. Russell (R)
 . Theodore Lyman (IR)
 . William W. Rice (R)
 . William Whiting (R)
 . George D. Robinson (R), until January 7, 1884
 Francis W. Rockwell (R), from January 17, 1884

Michigan 
 . William C. Maybury (D)
 . Nathaniel B. Eldredge (D)
 . Edward S. Lacey (R)
 . George L. Yaple (D)
 . Julius Houseman (D)
 . Edwin B. Winans (D)
 . Ezra C. Carleton (D)
 . Roswell G. Horr (R)
 . Byron M. Cutcheon (R)
 . Herschel H. Hatch (R)
 . Edward Breitung (R)

Minnesota 
 . Milo White (R)
 . James B. Wakefield (R)
 . Horace B. Strait (R)
 . William D. Washburn (R)
 . Knute Nelson (R)

Mississippi 
 . Henry L. Muldrow (D)
 . James R. Chalmers (I), from June 25, 1884
 . Elza Jeffords (R)
 . Hernando D. Money (D)
 . Otho R. Singleton (D)
 . Henry S. Van Eaton (D)
 . Ethelbert Barksdale (D)

Missouri 
 . William H. Hatch (D)
 . Armstead M. Alexander (D)
 . Alexander M. Dockery (D)
 . James N. Burnes (D)
 . Alexander Graves (D)
 . John Cosgrove (D)
 . Aylett H. Buckner (D)
 . John J. O'Neill (D)
 . James O. Broadhead (D)
 . Martin L. Clardy (D)
 . Richard P. Bland (D)
 . Charles H. Morgan (D)
 . Robert W. Fyan (D)
 . Lowndes H. Davis (D)

Nebraska 
 . Archibald J. Weaver (R)
 . James Laird (R)
 . Edward K. Valentine (R)

Nevada 
 . George W. Cassidy (D)

New Hampshire 
 . Martin A. Haynes (R)
 . Ossian Ray (R)

New Jersey 
 . Thomas M. Ferrell (D)
 . J. Hart Brewer (R)
 . John Kean Jr. (R)
 . Benjamin F. Howey (R)
 . William W. Phelps (R)
 . William H. F. Fiedler (D)
 . William McAdoo (D)

New York 
 . Perry Belmont (D)
 . William E. Robinson (D)
 . Darwin R. James (R)
 . Felix Campbell (D)
 . Nicholas Muller (D)
 . Samuel S. Cox (D)
 . William Dorsheimer (D)
 . John J. Adams (D)
 . John Hardy (D)
 . Abram S. Hewitt (D)
 . Orlando B. Potter (D)
 . Waldo Hutchins (D)
 . John H. Ketcham (R)
 . Lewis Beach (D)
 . John H. Bagley Jr. (D)
 . Thomas J. Van Alstyne (D)
 . Henry G. Burleigh (R)
 . Frederick A. Johnson (R)
 . Abraham X. Parker (R)
 . Edward Wemple (D)
 . George W. Ray (R)
 . Charles R. Skinner (R)
 . John T. Spriggs (D)
 . Newton W. Nutting (R)
 . Frank Hiscock (R)
 . Sereno E. Payne (R)
 . James W. Wadsworth (R)
 . Stephen C. Millard (R)
 . John Arnot Jr. (D)
 . Halbert S. Greenleaf (D)
 . Robert S. Stevens (D)
 . William F. Rogers (D)
 . Francis B. Brewer (R)
 . Henry W. Slocum (D)

North Carolina 
 . Walter F. Pool (R), until August 25, 1883
 Thomas G. Skinner (D), from November 20, 1883
 . James E. O'Hara (R)
 . Wharton J. Green (D)
 . William Ruffin Cox (D)
 . Alfred M. Scales (D), until December 30, 1884
 James W. Reid (D), from January 28, 1885
 . Clement Dowd (D)
 . Tyre York (ID)
 . Robert B. Vance (D)
 . Risden T. Bennett (D)

Ohio 
 . John F. Follett (D)
 . Isaac M. Jordan (D)
 . Robert M. Murray (D)
 . Benjamin Le Fevre (D)
 . George E. Seney (D)
 . William D. Hill (D)
 . Henry L. Morey (R), until June 20, 1884
 James E. Campbell (D), from June 20, 1884
 . J. Warren Keifer (R)
 . James S. Robinson (R), until January 12, 1885
 . Frank H. Hurd (D)
 . John W. McCormick (R)
 . Alphonso Hart (R)
 . George L. Converse (D)
 . George W. Geddes (D)
 . Adoniram J. Warner (D)
 . Beriah Wilkins (D)
 . Joseph D. Taylor (R)
 . William McKinley (R), until May 27, 1884
 Jonathan H. Wallace (D), from May 27, 1884
 . Ezra B. Taylor (R)
 . David R. Paige (D)
 . Martin A. Foran (D)

Oregon 
 . Melvin C. George (R)

Pennsylvania 
 . Henry H. Bingham (R)
 . Charles O'Neill (R)
 . Samuel J. Randall (D)
 . William D. Kelley (R)
 . Alfred C. Harmer (R)
 . James B. Everhart (R)
 . I. Newton Evans (R)
 . Daniel Ermentrout (D)
 . A. Herr Smith (R)
 . William Mutchler (D)
 . John B. Storm (D)
 . Daniel W. Connolly (D)
 . Charles N. Brumm (GB)
 . Samuel F. Barr (R)
 . George A. Post (D)
 . William W. Brown (R)
 . Jacob M. Campbell (R)
 . Louis E. Atkinson (R)
 . William A. Duncan (D), until November 14, 1884
 John A. Swope (D), from December 23, 1884
 . Andrew G. Curtin (D)
 . Charles E. Boyle (D)
 . James H. Hopkins (D)
 . Thomas M. Bayne (R)
 . George V. Lawrence (R)
 . John D. Patton (D)
 . Samuel H. Miller (R)
 . Samuel M. Brainerd (R)
 . Mortimer F. Elliott (D)

Rhode Island 
 . Henry J. Spooner (R)
 . Jonathan Chace (R), until January 26, 1885
 Nathan F. Dixon III (R), from February 12, 1885

South Carolina 
 . Samuel Dibble (D)
 . George D. Tillman (D)
 . D. Wyatt Aiken (D)
 . John H. Evins (D), until October 20, 1884
 John Bratton (D), from December 8, 1884
 . John J. Hemphill (D)
 . George W. Dargan (D)
 . Edmund W. M. Mackey (R), until January 27, 1884
 Robert Smalls (R), from March 18, 1884

Tennessee 
 . Augustus H. Pettibone (R)
 . Leonidas C. Houk (R)
 . George G. Dibrell (D)
 . Benton McMillin (D)
 . Richard Warner (D)
 . Andrew J. Caldwell (D)
 . John G. Ballentine (D)
 . John M. Taylor (D)
 . Rice A. Pierce (D)
 . H. Casey Young (D)

Texas 
 . Charles Stewart (D)
 . John H. Reagan (D)
 . James H. Jones (D)
 . David B. Culberson (D)
 . James W. Throckmorton (D)
 . Olin Wellborn (D)
 . Thomas P. Ochiltree (I)
 . James F. Miller (D)
 . Roger Q. Mills (D)
 . John Hancock (D)
 . Samuel W. T. Lanham (D)

Vermont 
 . John W. Stewart (R)
 . Luke P. Poland (R)

Virginia 
 . Robert M. Mayo (RA), until March 20, 1884
 George T. Garrison (D), from March 20, 1884
 . Harry Libbey (RA)
 . George D. Wise (D)
 . Benjamin S. Hooper (RA)
 . George Cabell (D)
 . John R. Tucker (D)
 . John Paul (D), until September 5, 1883
 Charles T. O'Ferrall (D), from May 5, 1884
 . John S. Barbour Jr. (D)
 . Henry Bowen (RA)
 . John S. Wise (RA)

West Virginia 
 . Nathan Goff (R)
 . William L. Wilson (D)
 . John E. Kenna (D), until March 4, 1883
 Charles P. Snyder (D), from May 15, 1883
 . Eustace Gibson (D)

Wisconsin 
 . John Winans (D)
 . Daniel H. Sumner (D)
 . Burr W. Jones (D)
 . Peter V. Deuster (D)
 . Joseph Rankin (D)
 . Richard W. Guenther (R)
 . Gilbert M. Woodward (D)
 . William T. Price (R)
 . Isaac Stephenson (R)

Non-voting members 
 . Granville H. Oury (D)
 . John B. Raymond (R)
 . Theodore F. Singiser (R)
 . Martin Maginnis (D)
 . Tranqulino Luna (R), until March 5, 1884
 Francisco A. Manzanares (D), from March 5, 1884
 . John T. Caine (D)
 . Thomas H. Brents (R)
 . Morton E. Post (D)

Changes in membership
The count below reflects changes from the beginning of the first session of this Congress.

Senate 
 Replacements: 1
 Democratic: no net change
 Republican: 1 seat net gain
 Liberal Republican: 1 seat net loss
 Deaths: 1
 Resignations: 0
 Interim appointment: 1
 Late election: 1
Total seats with changes: 3

|-
| New Hampshire (2)
| nowrap | Vacant
| Legislature had failed to elect.Senator elected August 2, 1883.
| nowrap  | Austin F. Pike (R)
| August 2, 1883

|-
| Rhode Island (2)
| nowrap  | Henry B. Anthony (R)
| Incumbent died September 2, 1884.Successor appointed November 19, 1884.
| nowrap  | William P. Sheffield (R)
| November 19, 1884

|-
| Rhode Island (2)
| nowrap  | William P. Sheffield (R)
| Interim appointee replaced by successor elected January 20, 1885.
| nowrap  | Jonathan Chace (R)
| January 20, 1885

|}

House of Representatives 
 Replacements: 15
 Democratic: 1 seat net gain
 Republican: 1 seat net loss
 National Greenback: 1 seat net gain
 Deaths: 9
 Resignations: 9
 Contested election: 8
Total seats with changes: 25

|-
| 
| Vacant
| Chalmers took seat after an election contest with Van H. Manning who challenged his election
| nowrap  | James R. Chalmers (I)
| June 25, 1884

|-
| 
| nowrap  | John E. Kenna (D)
| Resigned March 4, 1883, when elected U.S. Senator.
| nowrap  | Charles P. Snyder (D)
| May 15, 1883

|-
| 
| nowrap  | Thomas H. Herndon (D)
| Died March 28, 1883.
| nowrap  | James T. Jones (D)
| December 3, 1883

|-
| 
| nowrap  | Marsena E. Cutts (R)
| Died September 1, 1883.
| nowrap  | John C. Cook (D)
| October 9, 1883

|-
| 
| nowrap  | John Paul (D)
| Resigned September 5, 1883 to become judge of the U.S. District Court of the Western District of Virginia. The House election was subsequently contested.
| nowrap  | Charles T. O'Ferrall (D)
| May 5, 1884

|-
| 
| nowrap  | Dudley C. Haskell (R)
| Died December 16, 1883.
| nowrap  | Edward H. Funston (R)
| March 21, 1884

|-
| 
| nowrap  | Walter F. Pool (R)
| Died August 25, 1883.
| nowrap  | Thomas G. Skinner (D)
| November 20, 1883

|-
| 
| nowrap  | George D. Robinson (R)
| Resigned January 7, 1884 when elected Governor of Massachusetts.
| nowrap  | Francis W. Rockwell (R)
| January 17, 1884

|-
| 
| nowrap  | Edmund W. M. Mackey (R)
| Died January 27, 1884.
| nowrap  | Robert Smalls (R)
| March 18, 1884

|-
| 
| nowrap  | Tranquilino Luna (R)
| Lost contested election March 5, 1884.
| nowrap  | Francisco A. Manzanares (D)
| March 5, 1884

|-
| 
| nowrap  | Robert M. Mayo (RA)
| Lost contested election March 20, 1884.
| nowrap  | George T. Garrison (D)
| March 20, 1884

|-
| 
| nowrap  | Stanton J. Peelle (R)
| Lost contested election May 22, 1884.
| nowrap  | William E. English (D)
| May 22, 1884

|-
| 
| nowrap  | William McKinley (R)
| Lost contested election May 27, 1884.
| nowrap  | Jonathan H. Wallace (D)
| May 27, 1884

|-
| 
| nowrap  | Henry L. Morey (R)
| Lost contested election June 20, 1884.
| nowrap  | James E. Campbell (D)
| June 20, 1884

|-
| 
| nowrap  | John A. Kasson (R)
| Resigned July 13, 1884 to become U.S. Minister to Germany.
| nowrap  | Hiram Y. Smith (R)
| December 2, 1884

|-
| 
| nowrap  | William H. Calkins (R)
| Resigned October 20, 1884.
|  | Benjamin F. Shively (AM)
| December 1, 1884

|-
| 
| nowrap  | John H. Evins (D)
| Died October 20, 1884.
| nowrap  | John Bratton (D)
| December 8, 1884

|-
| 
| nowrap  | William A. Duncan (D)
| Died November 14, 1884.
| nowrap  | John A. Swope (D)
| December 23, 1884

|-
| 
| nowrap  | Alfred M. Scales (D)
| Resigned December 30, 1884 when elected Governor of North Carolina.
| nowrap  | James W. Reid (D)
| January 28, 1885

|-
| 
| nowrap  | Charles M. Shelley (D)
| Lost contested election January 9, 1885.
| nowrap  | George H. Craig (R)
| January 9, 1885

|-
| 
| nowrap  | James S. Robinson (R)
| Resigned January 12, 1885 to become Ohio Secretary of State.
| Vacant
| Not filled this term

|-
| 
| nowrap  | Jonathan Chace (R)
| Resigned January 26, 1885 when elected U.S. Senator.
| nowrap  | Nathan F. Dixon III (R)
| February 12, 1885

|-
| 
| nowrap  | James K. Jones (D)
| Resigned February 19, 1885 when elected U.S. Senator.
| Vacant
| Not filled this term

|-
| 
| nowrap  | James Wilson (R)
| Lost contested election March 3, 1885.
| nowrap  | Benjamin T. Frederick (D)
| March 3, 1885

|}

Committees

Senate

 Additional Accommodations for the Library of Congress (Select) (Chairman: Daniel W. Voorhees; Ranking Member: Justin S. Morrill)
 Agriculture and Forestry (Chairman: Warner Miller; Ranking Member: James Z. George)
 Appropriations (Chairman: William B. Allison; Ranking Member: James B. Beck)
 Audit and Control the Contingent Expenses of the Senate (Chairman: John P. Jones; Ranking Member: Zebulon B. Vance)
 Civil Service and Retrenchment (Chairman: Joseph R. Hawley; Ranking Member: James D. Walker)
 Claims (Chairman: Angus Cameron; Ranking Member: Howell E. Jackson)
 Commerce (Chairman: Samuel J. R. McMillan; Ranking Member: Matt W. Ransom)
 Distributing Public Revenue Among the States (Select)
 District of Columbia (Chairman: John J. Ingalls; Ranking Member: Isham G. Harris)
 Education and Labor (Chairman: Henry W. Blair; Ranking Member: Richard Coke)
 Engrossed Bills (Chairman: Eli Saulsbury; Ranking Member: William B. Allison)
 Enrolled Bills (Chairman: William J. Sewell; Ranking Member: Alfred H. Colquitt)
 Epidemic Diseases (Select) (Chairman: Isham G. Harris; Ranking Member: William J. Sewell)
 Examine the Several Branches in the Civil Service (Select) (Chairman: Shelby M. Cullom; Ranking Member: Wade Hampton III)
 Expenditures of Public Money (Chairman: James F. Wilson; Ranking Member: James B. Beck)
 Finance (Chairman: Justin S. Morrill; Ranking Member: Thomas F. Bayard)
 Fisheries (Chairman: Elbridge G. Lapham; Ranking Member: John T. Morgan)
 Foreign Relations (Chairman: John F. Miller; Ranking Member: John T. Morgan) 
 Indian Affairs (Chairman: Henry L. Dawes; Ranking Member: Richard Coke)
 Judiciary (Chairman: George F. Edmunds; Ranking Member: Augustus H. Garland) 
 Library (Chairman: John Sherman; Ranking Member: Daniel W. Voorhees)
 Manufactures (Chairman: Harrison H. Riddleberger; Ranking Member: John S. Williams)
 Military Affairs (Chairman: John A. Logan; Ranking Member: Francis M. Cockrell)
 Mines and Mining (Chairman: Thomas M. Bowen; Ranking Member: Wade Hampton III)
 Mississippi River and its Tributaries (Select) (Chairman: Charles H. Van Wyck; Ranking Member: Benjamin F. Jonas)
 Naval Affairs (Chairman: J. Donald Cameron; Ranking Member: John R. McPherson)
 Nicaraguan Claims (Select) (Chairman: Samuel B. Maxey; Ranking Member: Nathaniel P. Hill)
 Ordnance and War Ships (Select)
 Patents (Chairman: Orville H. Platt; Ranking Member: Richard Coke)
 Pensions (Chairman: John I. Mitchell; Ranking Member: James H. Slater)
 Post Office and Post Roads (Chairman: Nathaniel P. Hill; Ranking Member: Samuel B. Maxey)
 Potomac River Front (Select)
 Printing (Chairman: Charles F. Manderson; Ranking Member: N/A)
 Private Land Claims (Chairman: Thomas F. Bayard; Ranking Member: George F. Edmunds)
 Privileges and Elections (Chairman: George F. Hoar; Ranking Member: Eli Saulsbury)
 Public Buildings and Grounds (Chairman: William Mahone; Ranking Member: Charles W. Jones)
 Public Lands (Chairman: Preston B. Plumb; Ranking Member: James H. Slater)
 Railroads (Chairman: Philetus Sawyer; Ranking Member: Lucius Quintus Cincinnatus Lamar II) 
 Revision of the Laws (Chairman: Omar D. Conger; Ranking Member: George H. Pendleton)
 Revolutionary Claims (Chairman: Charles W. Jones; Ranking Member: Henry B. Anthony then Samuel J.R. McMillan)
 Rules (Chairman: William P. Frye; Ranking Member: Isham G. Harris)
 Sioux and Crow Indians (Select)
 Steel Producing Capacity of the United States (Select)
 Tariff Regulation (Select)
 Tenth Census (Select) (Chairman: Eugene Hale; Ranking Member: George H. Pendleton)
 Territories (Chairman: Benjamin Harrison; Ranking Member: Matthew C. Butler)
 Transportation Routes to the Seaboard (Chairman: Nelson W. Aldrich; Ranking Member: James T. Farley)
 Whole
 Woman Suffrage (Select) (Chairman: Francis M. Cockrell; Ranking Member: Henry W. Blair)

House of Representatives

 Accounts (Chairman: George W. Covington; Ranking Member: J. Hart Brewer)
 Agriculture (Chairman: William H. Hatch; Ranking Member: John D. Patton)
 Alcoholic Liquor Traffic (Select) (Chairman: William D. Cox; Ranking Member: N/A)
 American Ship building (Select)
 Appropriations (Chairman: Samuel J. Randall; Ranking Member: James N. Burnes)
 Banking and Currency (Chairman: Aylett H. Buckner; Ranking Member: George L. Yaple)
 Boynton Investigation (Select)
 Claims (Chairman: Benton McMillin; Ranking Member: Charles P. Snyder)
 Coinage, Weights and Measures (Chairman: Richard P. Bland; Ranking Member: Pleasant B. Tully)
 Commerce (Chairman: John H. Reagan; Ranking Member: Ethelbert Barksdale)
 District of Columbia (Chairman: John S. Barbour; Ranking Member: Samuel F. Barr)
 Education (Chairman: D. Wyatt Aiken; Ranking Member: John Winans)
 Elections (Chairman: Henry G. Turner; Ranking Member: John J. Adams)
 Enrolled Bills (Chairman: William H. Neece; Ranking Member: Adoniram J. Holmes) 
 Expenditures in the Interior Department (Chairman: Casey Young; Ranking Member: Charles N. Brumm)
 Expenditures in the Justice Department (Chairman: William M. Springer; Ranking Member: Henry Bowen)
 Expenditures in the Navy Department (Chairman: Leopold Morse; Ranking Member: Leonidas C. Houk)
 Expenditures in the Post Office Department (Chairman: Charles H. Morgan; Ranking Member: Stanton J. Peelle)
 Expenditures in the State Department (Chairman: Thomas Hardeman; Ranking Member: Samuel F. Barr)
 Expenditures in the Treasury Department (Chairman: Lowndes H. Davis; Ranking Member: Edward S. Lacey)
 Expenditures in the War Department (Chairman: Philip B. Thompson; Ranking Member: Robert M. Mayo)
 Expenditures on Public Buildings (Chairman: Perry Belmont; Ranking Member: Alfred C. Harmer)
 Foreign Affairs (Chairman: Andrew G. Curtin; Ranking Member: John E. Lamb)
 Indian Affairs (Chairman: Olin Wellborn; Ranking Member: Thomas G. Skinner)
 Invalid Pensions (Chairman: Courtland C. Matson; Ranking Member: John H. Bagley Jr.)
 Judiciary (Chairman: John R. Tucker; Ranking Member: William C. Maybury) 
 Labor (Chairman: James H. Hopkins; Ranking Member: Henry B. Lovering)
 Levees and Improvements of the Mississippi River (Chairman: J. Floyd King; Ranking Member: Barclay Henley)
 Manufactures (Chairman: John H. Bagley Jr.; Ranking Member: Robert M. Murray)
 Mileage (Chairman: Samuel W. Moulton; Ranking Member: Ambrose A. Ranney)
 Military Affairs (Chairman: William S. Rosecrans; Ranking Member: William A. Duncan)
 Militia (Chairman: Nicholas Muller; Ranking Member: John G. Ballentine)
 Mines and Mining (Chairman: Richard Warner; Ranking Member: Robert S. Stevens)
 Naval Affairs (Chairman: Samuel S. Cox; Ranking Member: William McAdoo)
 Pacific Railroads (Chairman: George W. Cassidy; Ranking Member: George A. Post)
 Patents (Chairman: Robert B. Vance; Ranking Member: John Winans)
 Pensions (Chairman: Goldsmith W. Hewitt; Ranking Member: Frank L. Wolford)
 Post Office and Post Roads (Chairman: Hernando D. Money; Ranking Member: David R. Paige)
 Private Land Claims (Chairman: Henry L. Muldrow; Ranking Member: Robert Lowry)
 Public Buildings and Grounds (Chairman: Strother M. Stockslager; Ranking Member: Nicholas E. Worthington)
 Public Lands (Chairman: Thomas R. Cobb; Ranking Member: Henry S. Van Eaton)
 Railways and Canals (Chairman: Robert H. M. Davidson; Ranking Member: Edward Wemple)
 Revision of Laws (Chairman: William C. Oates; Ranking Member: John J. Hemphill)
 Rivers and Harbors (Chairman: Albert S. Willis; Ranking Member: Julius Houseman)
 Rules (Chairman: John G. Carlisle; Ranking Member: J. Warren Keifer) 
 Standards of Official Conduct
 Territories (Chairman: Luke Pryor; Ranking Member: Martin A. Foran)
 War Claims (Chairman: George W. Geddes; Ranking Member: Thomas M. Ferrell)
 Ways and Means (Chairman: William R. Morrison; Ranking Member: James K. Jones)
 Whole

Joint committees

 Conditions of Indian Tribes (Special)
 Enrolled Bills (Chairman: Sen. William J. Sewell; Vice Chairman: Rep. Alfred H. Colquitt)
 The Library (Chairman: Sen. John Sherman; Vice Chairman: Rep. Daniel W. Voorhees)
 Printing (Chairman: Sen. Henry B. Anthony then Joseph R. Hawley; Vice Chairman: Rep. Arthur P. Gorman)
 Public Buildings and Grounds (Chairman: Sen. William Mahone; Vice Chairman: Rep. Charles W. Jones)
 Scientific Bureaus

Caucuses
 Democratic (House)
 Democratic (Senate)

Employees

Legislative branch agency directors 
 Architect of the Capitol: Edward Clark
 Librarian of Congress: Ainsworth Rand Spofford 
 Public Printer of the United States: Sterling P. Rounds

Senate 
 Chaplain: Joseph J. Bullock (Presbyterian), to December 18, 1883
 Elias D. Huntley (Methodist), from December 18, 1883
 Librarian: P. J. Pierce, to 1884
 George M. Weston, from 1884
 Secretary: Francis E. Shober (Acting), to December 18, 1883
 Anson G. McCook, from December 18, 1883
 Sergeant at Arms: Richard J. Bright, to December 18, 1883
 William P. Canady, from December 18, 1883

House of Representatives 
 Chaplain: Frederick D. Power (Disciples of Christ), until December 3, 1883
 John S. Lindsay (Episcopalian), elected December 3, 1883
 Clerk: John B. Clark Jr., elected December 3, 1883
 Clerk at the Speaker's Table: Nathaniel T. Crutchfield
 Doorkeeper: James G. Wintersmith, elected December 3, 1883
 Postmaster: Lycurgus Dalton, elected December 3, 1883
 Reading Clerks: T.O. Walker (D) and Neill S. Brown Jr. (R)
 Sergeant at Arms: George W. Hooker, until December 4, 1883
 John P. Leedom, until December 4, 1883

See also 
 1882 United States elections (elections leading to this Congress)
 1882–83 United States Senate elections
 1882 United States House of Representatives elections
 1884 United States elections (elections during this Congress, leading to the next Congress)
 1884 United States presidential election
 1884–85 United States Senate elections
 1884 United States House of Representatives elections

Notes

References

External links
Biographical Directory of the U.S. Congress
U.S. House of Representatives: House History
U.S. Senate: Statistics and Lists